The Military ranks of Malta are the military insignia used by the Armed Forces of Malta. Malta shares a rank structure similar to that of the United Kingdom, but has no sleeve insignia for its air wing. The Maltese armed forces inherited the rank system of the Royal Malta Artillery through its conversion to the 1st Regiment of the then Malta Land Force.

Commissioned officers
The rank insignia for commissioned officers for the army and Maritime Squadron respectively.

Enlisted
The rank insignia for enlisted personnel for the army and Maritime Squadron respectively.

References

Malta and the Commonwealth of Nations
Malta